Sólveig Guðrún Pétursdóttir (born 11 March 1952) is an Icelandic politician a former speaker of the Althing, the Icelandic parliament, serving between 2005 and 2007. She was a parliament member from 1991, for the Reykjavík Constituency (1991–2003), and the Reykjavik Constituency South (2003–2007). She is a member of the Independence Party. Sólveig was Iceland's Minister of Justice and Ecclesiastical Affairs 1999–2003. She is a lawyer from the University of Iceland (1977).

References

External links 
 The Althing's Web Site
 Biography of Sólveig Guðrún Pétursdóttir on the parliament website [In Icelandic]

1952 births
Living people
Solveig Petursdottir
Solveig Petursdottir
Solveig Petursdottir
Solveig Petursdottir
Female interior ministers
Female justice ministers